Friville-Escarbotin ) is a commune in the Somme department in Hauts-de-France in northern France.

Geography

Monuments

The monument aux morts in this commune features sculptural work by Albert-Dominique Roze. A montage of photographs of this work is shown below.

Population

See also
Communes of the Somme department
War memorials (Western Somme)

References

Communes of Somme (department)